Pittsburgh Indians were a mid-twentieth-century American soccer club based in Pittsburgh, Pennsylvania.  It began as Pittsburgh Stasser before becoming the Indians in 1947.

History
In 1946, several successful Midwest U.S. teams organized the first professional, regional soccer league outside of the east coast.  The North American Soccer Football League played an eight-game season in 1946, then the first half of the 1947 season before collapsing in the fall of 1947.  Peter Strasser entered a team, known as Pittsburgh Stasser in the league.  Pittsburgh was renamed the Indians in 1947 and led the standings for the first half of the season.  As the league collapsed soon after, they are considered the de facto 1947 champions.

Year-by-year

References

Defunct soccer clubs in Pennsylvania
Indians
1946 establishments in Pennsylvania
1947 disestablishments in Pennsylvania
Association football clubs established in 1946
Association football clubs disestablished in 1947